Ghar Ek Mandir may refer to:

 Ghar Ek Mandir (TV series), an Indian television show
 Ghar Ek Mandir (film), a 1984 Hindi-language Indian film